The 2018 Northwest Territories Men's Curling Championship was played February 6–10 at the Inuvik Curling Club in Inuvik. The winning Jamie Koe team represented the Northwest Territories at the 2018 Tim Hortons Brier in Regina.

Teams

The teams are listed as follows:

A Event

B Event

C Event

Playoffs

A vs B
Saturday, February 10, 19:00

C1 Vs C2
Saturday, February 10, 19:00

Semifinal
Sunday, February 11, 09:00

Final
Sunday, February 11, 14:00

References

2018 Tim Hortons Brier
Curling in the Northwest Territories
2018 in the Northwest Territories
February 2018 sports events in Canada
Inuvik